Red peas soup is a soup eaten in Jamaica. It is made of kidney beans (known locally as red peas), seasonings such as scotch bonnet pepper, pimento seeds, etc. Traditionally, the broth includes a pigtail. Red Peas Soup is usually eaten with yam and Jamaican dumplings.

See also
 List of Jamaican dishes

References

Jamaican soups